The  was a field army of the Imperial Japanese Army during both the Second Sino-Japanese War and World War II.

History
The Japanese 6th Area Army was formed on August 25, 1944 under the China Expeditionary Army primarily as a military reserve and garrison force for the occupation of the central provinces of China between the Yangtze River and the Yellow River. After the success of Operation Ichi-Go, many veteran units were transferred out of China to fronts in the Pacific War, which left the 6th Area Army to guard gains in central China. The 6th Area Army was demobilized at the surrender of Japan on  August 15, 1945 at Hankou (part of modern Wuhan) in China, without having seen significant combat.

List of Commanders

Commanding officer

Chief of Staff

References

Books

External links

Notes 

6
Military units and formations established in 1944
Military units and formations disestablished in 1945